The 1985 Dutch TT was the seventh round of the 1985 Grand Prix motorcycle racing season. It took place on the weekend of 27–29 June 1985 at the TT Circuit Assen located in Assen, Netherlands.

Classification

500 cc

References

Dutch TT
Dutch
Tourist Trophy